"You Ain't Down Home" is a song written by Jamie O'Hara, and recorded by American country music artist Jann Browne.  It was released in July 1989 as the first single from the album Tell Me Why.  The song reached #19 on the Billboard Hot Country Singles & Tracks chart.

Cover versions
 Julie Roberts covered the song for her 2004 self-titled album.

Chart performance

References

1989 debut singles
Jann Browne songs
Julie Roberts songs
Songs written by Jamie O'Hara (singer)
Curb Records singles
1989 songs